The Yacht Club Italiano is a yacht club in Genoa, Italy.

History
It was founded in 1879 and is one of the oldest sailing clubs in the Mediterranean. This club was bestowed Royal Patronage by HRH King Umberto I of Italy since its inception.
This club has the privilege of the use of a special ensign, the "Bandiera della Marina Militare" (Italian Navy Flag).

Its first regatta took place in 1880 in the Bay of La Spezia with 177 yachts. Today the club boasts over 1,200 members.

Affiliation
The Yacht Club Italiano together with the Yacht Club de France runs the Giraglia Cup regatta from Saint Tropez, past Giraglia, the northernmost point of Corsica, to Genoa.

The club was from 2003 to 2007 the home to Luna Rossa Challenge, a syndicate that competes in America's Cup races.

References

External links

Yacht Club Italiano's webpage

Italiano
1879 establishments in Italy
Italian